The 4th Parapan American Games took place from November 12 to 20 in Guadalajara, Mexico. The Games are an international multi-sport event for athletes with a physical disability. The Games were held 20 days after the 2011 Pan American Games began. The opening and closing ceremonies were produced by FiveCurrents.

Infrastructure and Budget
A Guadalajara reporter said "The area is rough. It's just this side of being on the wrong side of the tracks. But it's not far from the theatre area or the downtown with some of the nicer, old colonial hotels, and the city hopes that the Villa Panamericana can rejuvenate the downtown historical area." The $300 million Guggenheim Guadalajara is nearby.

The city would have 22,000 hotel rooms by 2011, a new bus rapid transit system, Macrobús, that would run through the Calzada Independencia, and the Centro Cultural Metropolitano, an ambitious project of the Universidad de Guadalajara, which includes a 10,000-seat performing arts auditorium (Auditorio Telmex), the new public library of the state of Jalisco, among other buildings.

Participating nations
24 nations will be participating in the Games. The number of competitors qualified by each delegation is indicated in parentheses.

Sports
13 sports, with sub-disciplines, will be contested at the Games. These are:

Venues

Most of the new facilities are modest with temporary seating, intended to be utilized in future as training sites and teaching facilities for elite athletes or for community use.
 Telmex Athletics Stadium - Athletics, Opening Ceremony and Closing Ceremony
 Pan American Archery Stadium - Archery
 CODE Dome - Wheelchair Basketball
 Pan American Velodrome - Cycling (track)
 San Rafael Gymnasium - Goalball
 Pan American Hockey Stadium - Football 5-a-side
 CODE II Gymnasium - Table Tennis
 Telcel Tennis Complex - Wheelchair Tennis
 Pan American Volleyball Stadium - Sitting Volleyball
 Weightlifting Forum - Powerlifting
 Multipurpose Gymnasium - Judo
 Scotiabank Aquatics Center - Swimming

Calendar

Medal table

See also
2011 Pan American Games

References

External links
 
 
 

 
Parapan American Games
Parapan American Games
Parapan American Games 2011
Multi-sport events in Mexico
Parapan American Games
Parapan American Games